Ole Christian Öhman (born 13 October 1973) is a Swedish drummer who played in Dissection until their second album, Storm of the Light's Bane, was released in 1995.

Career 
He was the drummer for the Swedish industrial metal band Deathstars and is better known by the name Bone W. Machine, but has since parted ways.

In a January 2008 interview, Deathstars' vocalist Andreas Bergh stated that Öhman would not be playing with the group on their 2008 European spring tour with Korn as he "had to take care of his family back home". The rest of the band members fully supported Öhman's decision, and they were adamant that he was not leaving the band, due to their strong convictions on the matter. This was later confirmed by a statement on Deathstars' official website.

Injury 
In October 2009, Deathstars' bassist Skinny Kangur wrote in his blog that Öhman was diagnosed with a severe case of tennis elbow on his left arm and forced to leave the ongoing Into The Darkness Festival to give his arm some rest. One show in Frankfurt had to be shortened after Öhman performed 45 minutes in severe pain. A long-time friend of the band, Oscar Leander from Crescendolls, had since then been in charge of the drummer position for Deathstars' live performances until 2017.

After two years of Öhman's absence, later in October 2011, an interview with Emil Nödtveidt  and a post in Deathstars' Facebook page  revealed that Ole Öhman had actually parted ways with Deathstars since 2010. Öhman himself has neither confirmed nor given any public appearance since his withdrawal in 2009.

References 

Swedish drummers
Male drummers
Living people
1973 births
21st-century drummers
21st-century Swedish male musicians
Dissection (band) members
Ophthalamia members